Thomas Beckham (1810 – 31 July 1875) was a 19th-century New Zealand politician. He represented the City of Auckland electorate in the 2nd New Zealand Parliament from 1855 to 1859, but resigned before the end of his term and did not serve in any subsequent Parliament. He was also a member of the Auckland Provincial Council, representing the City of Auckland electorate in 1855–1856. During most of that time, he was a member of the Auckland Executive Council.

Notes

References

1810 births
1875 deaths
Flagstaff War
New Zealand MPs for Auckland electorates
Members of the Auckland Provincial Council
Members of the New Zealand House of Representatives
Members of Auckland provincial executive councils
19th-century New Zealand politicians
Date of birth missing
Sheriffs of New Zealand